is a train station on the Gakunan Railway Line in the city of Fuji, Shizuoka Prefecture, Japan. It was the terminal station for all freight operations by the Gakunan Railway, which was discontinued in 2012.

Lines

Station layout
Kamiya Station has one island platform connected to the station building by a level crossing. The station is unattended. In addition, multiple tracks for container freight services to neighboring industries parallel the passenger tracks.

Adjacent stations

Station history
Hina Station was opened on December 20, 1951.

Passenger statistics
In fiscal 2017, the station was used by an average of 142 passengers daily (boarding passengers only).

Surrounding area
 Fuji City High School
 Fuji Yoshinaga Industrial High School

See also
 List of Railway Stations in Japan

References

External links

 Gakunan Electric Train official website 

Railway stations in Shizuoka Prefecture
Railway stations in Japan opened in 1951
Fuji, Shizuoka